Portrait of the Artist's Family may refer to:

 Portrait of the Artist's Family (Holbein)
 Portrait of the Artist's Family (Sofonisba Anguissola)

See also
 Portrait of the Artist's Mother (disambiguation)